Maradana Railway Station is a major rail hub in Colombo, Sri Lanka.  The station is served by Sri Lanka Railways, with many inter-city and commuter trains entering each day.  It is the terminus of several intercity trains.

Maradana is home to the suburban-Colombo network's centralised traffic control centre.

History 
When the railways first opened in Ceylon (Sri Lanka) in 1864, trains terminated at Colombo Terminus Station, a now-retired station near Maradana.  In 1906, a project was launched to reorganise the railway within the Colombo area.  Colombo Terminus Station was closed and replaced by the new Maradana Station.

Fort Railway Station was opened in 1917, as a new central station for Colombo.  Today, Maradana and Fort are the primary rail gateways to Colombo.

Location 
Maradana Station is in Maradana, located next to the Elphinstone Theatre and near the Maradana Railway Yards.  Colombo Fort Station is a couple kilometres away from Maradana Station.

Features 
Maradana Station features a two-storey building housing the ticket office, waiting room, and Sri Lanka Railways offices.  A footbridge leads to the platforms.  The main building is an example of British colonial architecture.

The railways operates its centralised traffic control (CTC) for the Colombo area through a facility at Maradana.  The CTC handles about 290 trains per day.

Services 
The station is served from the north-east by the Main line, which leads to several other major routes in Sri Lanka's railway network.  To the south-east of the station, the Kelani Valley Line connects Maradana with many other area of Colombo.  The station is served to the west by the Coastal line, leading to Galle and Matara.  Most of these Coastal-line trains terminate at Maradana Station.

Maradana station is also a hub for commuter rail within the Colombo metropolis.

Inter-city trains

Commuter and local trains

Continuity

See also 
Railway stations in Sri Lanka
Sri Lanka Railways
List of railway stations by line order in Sri Lanka
Sri Lanka Railways

References 

Railway stations on the Coastal Line
Railway stations on the Main Line (Sri Lanka)
Railway stations on the Kelani Valley railway line
Railway stations opened in 1908
Railway stations in Colombo
1908 establishments in Ceylon
Archaeological protected monuments in Colombo District